

History 
Founded in 2004, Anomaly is a 'new model' agency with offices in Los Angeles, New York, Toronto, London, Amsterdam, Berlin and Shanghai.

Diversity of Recognition
Anomaly has been recognized for their work and IP, covering both effectiveness and craft excellence. They were Ad Age's 2017 Agency of the Year, and have featured on Fast Company's “World’s Most Innovative Companies” in 2008, 2014, and 2020

Additionally, Anomaly has won two Emmy's for Avec Eric, and their IP venture dosist was named one of Time Magazine's Best Inventions of 2016 (as hmbldt) and #2 on LinkedIn's Top 50 Best Startups to work at in 2019.

References

Advertising agencies based in New York City
American companies established in 2004
Mass media companies established in 2004